Caca Hermanto, stage name Caca Handika, is an Indonesian dangdut singer. Some of his hit songs are Undangan Palsu, Mandi Kembang, and Bakar Kemenyan. In addition as dangdut singer, Handika also designs to batik motifs. Handika had appeared on Yuk Keep Smile and other programs broadcast on Trans TV, such as Ngabuburit.

Handika had played debut television soap opera on 2000 Tuyul dan Mbak Yul (only appeared in one episode) by RCTI and in 2006 Handika also starred in a musical drama soap opera, titled Kampung Dangdut playing the role of Caca, the youngest brother of Bang Haji Rhoma (played by Rhoma Irama).

Currently, Handika is a vocal coach in an Indosiar' talent celebrity show D'Academy Celebrity.

Discography

Studio albums
 Damailah (1991)
 Undangan Palsu (1992)
 Bakar Kemenyan (1996)
 Angka Satu (2011)
 Bajing Luncat (2015)

EP album
 Air Mata Bawang (2008)

Compilation albums
 20 Dangdut Terbaik (2014)
 Super Hits Caca Handika (2014)
 Best of Caca Handika (2014)

Filmography

External links
 Profil Caca Handika di artisdangdutindonesia.com
 Profil dan Biodata Caca Handika di bagaikan.net 

Living people
People from Tasikmalaya
Sundanese people
21st-century Indonesian male singers
Indonesian dangdut singers
Indonesian television presenters
Indonesian male comedians
Indonesian comedians
Indonesian male actors
1957 births
20th-century Indonesian male singers